"Be My Baby" is a song by French singer and actress Vanessa Paradis. It was the first single from Paradis' eponymous third studio album (1992) and was released in September 1992. It was the singer's first single in the English language and was written by her companion at the time, Lenny Kravitz. It achieved great success in many countries, becoming a top-ten hit in Belgium, France, Germany, Ireland, the Netherlands, and the United Kingdom. The CD maxi contains Paradis' first hit single as a bonus track, "Joe le taxi". The accompanying music video for "Be My Baby" received heavy rotation on MTV Europe.

Background and release
Five years after her number-one debut single "Joe le Taxi", Vanessa Paradis had another international hit with "Be My Baby": it was her second single to be released in the US and Australia. The song was released in France during September 1992 and was given a widespread European release on 30 September 1992, shortly after the album was issued. "Be My Baby" was released on 28 September in the United Kingdom.

The single covers were the same for all the countries, but the design was different for the US where the word 'Paradis' was in white, instead of maroon. A three-single CD maxi was released in limited edition in UK. The booklet contains photos from the music video. A promotional CD was published in the US and sent to the media.

Track listings
 7-inch, cassette, and CD single
 "Be My Baby" – 3:19
 "The Future Song" – 4:54

 UK maxi-CD single
 "Be My Baby"
 "The Future Song"
 "Joe le Taxi"

 US cassette single
A. "Be My Baby" – 3:41
B. "Paradis" – 3:03

Charts

Weekly charts

Year-end charts

References

1992 singles
1992 songs
English-language French songs
Polydor Records singles
Song recordings produced by Lenny Kravitz
Songs written by Gerry DeVeaux
Songs written by Lenny Kravitz
Vanessa Paradis songs